Wunda is a large crater on the surface of Uranus' moon Umbriel. It is 131 km in diameter and is located near the equator of Umbriel. The crater is named after Wunda, a dark spirit of Australian aboriginal mythology.

Wunda has a prominent albedo feature on its floor, which takes the shape of a ring of bright material at least 10 km in radial width. The reason for its brightness, which stands out from the very dark composition of the moon as a whole, is unknown. It may be either a fresh impact deposit or a deposit of carbon dioxide ice, which formed when the radiolytically formed carbon dioxide migrated from all over the surface of Umbriel and got trapped inside relatively cold Wunda.

References 

Citations

Sources

 
 
 

Impact craters on Uranus' moons
Umbriel (moon)